Gerald Cunningham may refer to:

 Gerald Garrick Cunningham, New Zealand author, businessman and photographer
Gerald Cunningham, founder of Gerry (company)